Rayman Fiesta Run is a platform game developed by Ubisoft Casablanca and published by Ubisoft for iOS, Android, Windows Mobile, and Microsoft Windows. It is the sequel to Rayman Jungle Run.

Reception

The iOS version received "generally favorable reviews" according to the review aggregation website Metacritic.

References

External links
 

2013 video games
Android (operating system) games
IOS games
Platform games
Rayman
Ubisoft games
Video game sequels
Video games developed in Morocco
Windows games
Windows Mobile games